The white-tailed rubythroat has been split into the following species:

 Chinese rubythroat, Calliope tschebaiewi
 Himalayan rubythroat, Calliope pectoralis

Birds by common name